Rosetta is a female given name. Notable people with the name include:

 Rosetta Burke (born 1937), the first female Assistant Adjutant General of New York State and of the Army National Guard
 Rosetta Cattaneo (1919–1988), Italian sprinter
 Rosetta Cutolo (born 1937), sister of the notorious Camorra boss Raffaele Cutolo
 Rosetta Hightower (born 1944), American singer
 Rosetta Howard (1914–1974), American blues singer
 Rosetta LeNoire (1911–2002), American stage, screen and television actress
 Rosetta Loy (1931), Italian writer
 Rosetta Lulah Baume (1871–1934), New Zealand teacher, feminist and community leader
 Rosetta Pampanini (1896–1973), Italian soprano
 Rosetta Sherwood Hall (1865–1951), medical missionary and educator
 Rosetta Smith (1770–1775 — ca. 1825), Afro-Trinidadian slave trader and entrepreneur
 Sister Rosetta Tharpe, gospel and rock singer

Fictional characters:

 Rosetta Cammeniti, from the Australian soap opera Neighbours
 Rosetta, in the Disney Fairies franchise
 , Japanese name of the Nintendo character Rosalina
 , the Pretty Cure form of Alice Yotsuba

Feminine given names